William John Olner (9 May 1942 – 18 May 2020) was a British Labour Co-operative politician who served as Member of Parliament (MP) for Nuneaton from 1992 until 2010. Previously, he led Nuneaton Borough Council (which later merged with Bedworth to form Nuneaton and Bedworth Borough Council).

Education and early life

Olner was educated at Nuneaton Technical College and trained as an engineer. He became a shop steward, and later area secretary for the AEEU (now Unite trade union).

Political career
Olner was a councillor for the Labour group on Nuneaton and Bedworth Borough Council for 21 years and was the council leader from 1982 to 1987. In 1987 he became Mayor of Nuneaton and Bedworth, serving a 1-year term.

Olner was first elected to the House of Commons in 1992 as the Member of Parliament for Nuneaton. He was re-elected in the 1997 general election (majority 13,540), 2001 general election (majority 7,535) and 2005 general election (majority 2,280).

He most frequently asked questions about: mercury, the European Union (public information), funerals, satellite dishes, and skills councils. He most frequently asked questions to, and received answers to questions from, the Department for Environment, Food and Rural Affairs, the Foreign and Commonwealth Office, the Office of the Deputy Prime Minister, the Department of Health, and the Department for Work and Pensions.

Olner declared his retirement as MP for Nuneaton on 25 March 2007; he served until the 2010 general election, where Labour's new candidate, Jayne Innes, was defeated by Conservative Marcus Jones.

Return to local politics

Olner decided three years after leaving Parliament to stand in the 2013 Warwickshire County Council Elections for the Arbury and Stockingford constituency in Nuneaton. Olner won the seat with 2092 votes, keeping him in office until May 2017.

Following County Council boundary changes, Olner decided to stand in the new Nuneaton Abbey County Division in May 2017 and won the seat until his death in 2020. The division is currently the safest Labour seat in Warwickshire.

Personal life
Olner had a pet dog and lived with his wife Gill, who has been a school governor in the past.

Olner died from complications of COVID-19, amid the pandemic in England, at George Eliot Hospital in Nuneaton on 18 May 2020, at age 78.

References

External links 
 
 Guardian Unlimited Politics – Ask Aristotle: Bill Olner MP
 TheyWorkForYou.com – Bill Olner MP
 The Labour Party in your area – Nuneaton
Labour in Nuneaton

1942 births
2020 deaths
Councillors in Warwickshire
English trade unionists
Labour Party (UK) MPs for English constituencies
People from Atherstone
UK MPs 1992–1997
UK MPs 1997–2001
UK MPs 2001–2005
UK MPs 2005–2010
Deaths from the COVID-19 pandemic in England